Liam Thompson (born 3 January 1992) is an English professional rugby league footballer who last played for Oldham (Heritage № 1321) in Betfred League 1. He plays as a second-row or loose forward.

Background
Thompson was born in Wigan, Greater Manchester, England. He attended The University of Central Lancashire making numerous appearances for the Universities first team. He now resides in Surfers Paradise, Queensland, Australia.

Career
Thompson came through the Wigan Warriors academy and was in the junior systems of the Widnes Vikings. He has also represented England at Schoolboy level.

Thompson emigrated to Australia in 2018 signing for Stingrays RLFC Shellharbour later joining Currumbin Eagles.

References

External links
Oldham R.L.F.C. profile

1992 births
Living people
English rugby league players
Oldham R.L.F.C. players
Rugby league locks
Rugby league players from Wigan
Rugby league second-rows